The 2012–13 Indiana Hoosiers men's basketball team represented Indiana University in the 2012–13 college basketball season. Their head coach was Tom Crean, in his fifth season with the Hoosiers. The team played its home games at Assembly Hall in Bloomington, Indiana, and was a member of the Big Ten Conference.

Indiana spent ten weeks ranked as the #1 team in the country. The Hoosiers won the outright Big Ten regular season title with a 14–4 record. Indiana went 7–1 against AP Top-25 teams during the season; no other Big Ten team had better than a .500 record in that category. However, all four of the team's regular season losses came against non-ranked Top-25 opponents. The Hoosiers were five games above .500 (7–2) in road games; no other Big Ten team was better than 1 game over .500 on the road in league play. The program fell in the Sweet Sixteen for the second consecutive year.

Roster

Schedule

|-
!colspan=12 style="background:#7D110C; color:white;"| Exhibition

|-
!colspan=12 style="background:#7D110C; color:white;"| Non-conference regular season

|-
!colspan=12 style="background:#7D110C; color:white;"| Big Ten Regular Season

|-
!colspan=12 style="background:#7D110C; color:white;"| Big Ten Tournament

|-
!colspan=12 style="background:#7D110C; color:white;"| 2013 NCAA Tournament

Rankings

References

Indiana Hoosiers
Indiana Hoosiers men's basketball seasons
Indiana
Indiana Hoosiers men's basketball
Indiana Hoosiers men's basketball